The  is a branch of the Toki clan, which is descended from the Seiwa Genji. The Akechi clan thrived around the later part of the Sengoku period of the 16th century. The Akechi became the head, soryo of the Toki after the Toki fell to the Saitō clan in 1540. The Akechi refused to be under Saitō Yoshitatsu who attacked Nagayama castle. Akechi Mitsuhide then served shoguns Ashikaga Yoshiteru and Ashikaga Yoshiaki. After introducing Ashikaga Yoshiaki to Oda Nobunaga, Mitsuhide became a powerful general under Oda Nobunaga.  However, after 1582, Mitsuhide trapped Nobunaga at Honnō-ji and forced him to commit suicide. The Akechi then gained power due to the collapse of the Oda clan. Later that same year, Akechi Mitsuhide was slain at the Battle of Yamazaki, twelve days after the Incident at Honnō-ji. The Akechi clan then fell from prominence.

Important figures
 Akechi Mitsutsugu, grandfather of Akechi Mitsuhide. Mitsutsugu was father of Omi-no-kata, Saito Dosan wife.
 Akechi Mitsutsuna (died 1538), senior retainer under the Toki clan throughout the latter Sengoku period of feudal Japan
 Akechi Mitsuhide (c. 1520–1582), samurai who lived during the Sengoku period of Feudal Japan. Renowned for his betrayal and murder of Oda Nobunaga.
 Akechi Hidemitsu (died 1582), retainer beneath the clan of Akechi during the Azuchi-Momoyama period of Feudal Japan
 Akechi Mitsutada (died 1582), Japanese samurai of the Sengoku period who served the Akechi clan
 Akechi Mitsuyoshi (died 1582), Japanese samurai of the Sengoku period, son of Akechi Mitsuhide
 Hosokawa Gracia (1563–1600), daughter of Akechi Mitsuhide and a famous samurai convert to Christianity. Hosokawa Tadaoki's wife.

Family tree

References

See also
 Honnō-ji Incident (1582)
 Battle of Yamazaki (1582)

 
Japanese clans
Minamoto clan